The Levelling Up, Housing and Communities Committee (formerly the Housing, Communities and Local Government Committee) is a select committee of the House of Commons in the Parliament of the United Kingdom. The remit of the committee is to examine the work, the expenditure, administration and policies of the Department for Levelling Up, Housing and Communities (DLUHC) and its associated public bodies.

Membership
As of August 2022, the membership of the committee is as follows:

Source: Membership - Housing, Communities and Local Government Committee

Changes since 2019

2017-2019 Parliament
The chair was elected on 12 July 2017, with the members of the committee being announced on 11 September 2017.

Changes 2017-2019

2015-2017 Parliament
The chair was elected on 18 June 2015, with members being announced on 13 July 2015.

Changes 2015-2017

2010-2015 Parliament
The chair was elected on 10 June 2010, with members being announced on 12 July 2010.

Changes 2010-2015

Chair of the Select Committee

Election results
From June 2010 chairs of select committees have been directly elected by a secret ballot of the whole House of Commons using the alternative vote system. Candidates with the fewest votes are eliminated and their votes redistributed until one remaining candidate has more than half of valid votes. Elections are held at the beginning of a parliament or in the event of a vacancy.

See also 
Levelling-up policy of the Boris Johnson government
Parliamentary Committees of the United Kingdom

References

External links
Records for this Committee are held at the Parliamentary Archives
Levelling Up, Housing and Communities Committee

Select Committees of the British House of Commons